Dexter Gordon (February 27, 1923 – April 25, 1990) was an American jazz tenor saxophonist, composer, bandleader, and actor. He was among the most influential early bebop musicians, which included other greats such as Charlie Parker, Dizzy Gillespie, and Bud Powell. His studio and performance career spanned more than 40 years.

Gordon's sound was commonly characterized as being "large" and spacious and he had a tendency to play behind the beat. He was known for inserting musical quotes into his solos, with sources as diverse as "Happy Birthday" and well known melodies from the operas of Wagner. This is not unusual in jazz improvization, but Gordon did it frequently enough to make it a hallmark of his style. One of his major influences was Lester Young. Gordon, in turn, was an early influence on John Coltrane and Sonny Rollins. Rollins and Coltrane then influenced Gordon's playing as he explored hard bop and modal playing during the 1960s.

Gordon was known for his genial and humorous stage presence. He was an advocate of playing to communicate with the audience, which was his musical approach as well. His improvization was remarkably engaging and intelligent, but never gratuitously complex or unusual. It was always a conversation simultaneously delightful and intellectual. One of his idiosyncratic rituals was to recite lyrics from each ballad before playing it.

A photograph by Herman Leonard of Gordon taking a smoke break at the Royal Roost in 1948 is one of the iconic images in jazz photography. Cigarettes were a recurring theme on covers of Gordon's albums.

Gordon was nominated for an Academy Award for Best Actor in a Leading Role for his performance in the Bertrand Tavernier film Round Midnight (Warner Bros, 1986), and he won a Grammy for Best Jazz Instrumental Performance, Soloist, for the soundtrack album The Other Side of Round Midnight (Blue Note Records, 1986). He also had a cameo role in the 1990 film Awakenings. In 2018, Gordon's album Go (Blue Note, 1962) was selected by the Library of Congress for preservation in the National Recording Registry for being "culturally, historically, or aesthetically significant".

Life and career

Early life
Dexter Keith Gordon was born on February 27, 1923, in Los Angeles, California. His father, Dr. Frank Gordon, one of the first African American doctors in Los Angeles, arrived in 1918 after graduating from Howard University Medical School in Washington, D.C. Among his patients were Duke Ellington and Lionel Hampton. Dexter's mother, Gwendolyn Baker, was the daughter of Captain Edward Lee Baker, Jr. one of the five African American Medal of Honor recipients in the Spanish–American War.

Gordon began his study of music with the clarinet at age 13, then switched to the alto saxophone at 15, and finally to the tenor saxophone at 17. He studied with multi-instrumentalist Lloyd Reese while attending Thomas Jefferson High School, and studied with the school’s band director, Sam Browne. While still at school, he played in bands with such contemporaries as Chico Hamilton and Buddy Collette.

Between December 1940 and 1943, Gordon was a member of Lionel Hampton's band, playing in a saxophone section alongside Illinois Jacquet and Marshal Royal.  During 1944 he was featured in the Fletcher Henderson band, followed by the Louis Armstrong band, before joining Billy Eckstine.  The 1942–44 musicians' strike curtailed the recording of the Hampton, Henderson, and Armstrong bands; however, they were recorded on V-Discs produced by the Army for broadcast and distribution among overseas troops.  In 1943 he was featured, alongside Harry "Sweets" Edison, in recordings under Nat Cole for a small label not affected by the strike.

Bebop era recordings
By late 1944, Gordon was resident in New York, a regular at bebop jam sessions, and a featured soloist in the Billy Eckstine big band ("If That's The Way You Feel", "I Want To Talk About You", "Blowin' the Blues Away", "Opus X", "I'll Wait And Pray", "The Real Thing Happened To Me", "Lonesome Lover Blues", "I Love the Rhythm in a Riff"). During early 1945 he was featured on recordings by Dizzy Gillespie (Blue 'n' Boogie, Groovin' High) and Sir Charles Thompson (Takin' Off, If I Had You, 20th Century Blues, The Street Beat).  In late 1945 he was recording under his own name for the Savoy label.  His Savoy recordings during 1945-46 included Blow Mr. Dexter, Dexter's Deck, Dexter's Minor Mad, Long Tall Dexter, Dexter Rides Again, I Can't Escape From You,and Dexter Digs In.  He returned to Los Angeles in late 1946 and in 1947 was leading sessions for Ross Russell's Dial label (Mischievous Lady, Lullaby in Rhythm, The Chase, Iridescence, It's the Talk of the Town, Bikini, A Ghost of a Chance, Sweet and Lovely). After his return to Los Angeles, he became known for his saxophone duels with fellow tenorman Wardell Gray, which were a popular concert attraction documented in recordings made between 1947 and 1952 (The Hunt, Move, The Chase, The Steeplechase).  The Hunt gained literary fame from its mention in Jack Kerouac's On The Road, which also contains descriptions of wild tenormen jamming in Los Angeles.  Cherokee, Byas a Drink, and Disorder at the Border are other live recordings of the Gray/Gordon duo from the same concert (all issued on the album The Hunt in 1977).  In December 1947, Gordon recorded again with the Savoy label (Settin' the Pace, So Easy, Dexter's Riff, Dextrose, Dexter's Mood, Index, Dextivity, Wee Dot, Lion Roars).  Through the mid-to-late 1940s he continued to work as a sideman on sessions led by Russell Jacquet, Benny Carter, Ben Webster, Ralph Burns, Jimmy Rushing, Helen Humes, Gerry Mulligan, Wynonie Harris, Leo Parker, and Tadd Dameron.

The 1950s
During the 1950s, Gordon's recorded output and live appearances declined as heroin addiction and legal troubles took their toll.  Gordon made a concert appearance with Wardell Gray in February 1952 (The Chase, The Steeplechase, Take the A Train, Robbins Nest, Stardust) and appeared as a sideman in a session led by Gray in June 1952 (The Rubiyat, Jungle Jungle Jump, Citizen's Bop, My Kinda Love).  After an incarceration at Chino Prison from 1953 to 1955, he recorded the albums Daddy Plays the Horn and Dexter Blows Hot and Cool in 1955 and played as a sideman on the Stan Levey album, This Time the Drum's on Me.  The latter part of the decade saw him in and out of prison until his final release from Folsom Prison in 1959. He was one of the initial sax players for the Onzy Matthews big band in 1959, along with Curtis Amy. Gordon continued to champion Matthews' band after he left Los Angeles for New York, but left for Europe before getting a chance to record with that band. He recorded The Resurgence of Dexter Gordon in 1960.  His recordings from the mid-1950s onward document a meander into a smooth West Coast style that lacked the impact of his bebop era recordings or his subsequent Blue Note recordings.

The decade saw Gordon's first entry into the world of drama. He appeared as a member (uncredited) of Art Hazzard's band in the film Young Man with a Horn (1950). He appeared in an uncredited and overdubbed role as a member of a prison band in the movie Unchained, filmed inside Chino.  Gordon was a saxophonist performing Freddie Redd's music for the Los Angeles production of Jack Gelber's play The Connection in 1960, replacing Jackie McLean. He contributed two compositions, Ernie's Tune and I Want More to the score and later recorded them for his album Dexter Calling....

New York renaissance
Gordon signed to Blue Note in 1961. He initially commuted from Los Angeles to New York to record, but took up residence when he regained the cabaret card that allowed him to perform where alcohol was served. The Jazz Gallery hosted his first New York performance in twelve years. The Blue Note association was to produce a steady flow of albums for several years, some of which gained iconic status. His New York renaissance was marked by Doin' Allright, Dexter Calling..., Go!, and A Swingin' Affair. The first two were recorded over three days in May 1961 with Freddie Hubbard, Horace Parlan, Kenny Drew, Paul Chambers, George Tucker, Al Harewood, and Philly Joe Jones. The last two were recorded in August 1962, with a rhythm section that featured Blue Note regulars Sonny Clark, Butch Warren and Billy Higgins. Of the two Go! was an expressed favorite. The albums showed his assimilation of the hard bop and modal styles that had developed during his years on the west coast, and the influence of John Coltrane and Sonny Rollins, whom he had influenced before. The stay in New York turned out to be short lived, as Gordon got offers for engagements in England, then Europe, that resulted in a fourteen-year stay. Soon after recording A Swingin' Affair, he left the United States.

Years in Europe
Over the next 14 years in Europe, living mainly in Paris and Copenhagen, Gordon played regularly with fellow expatriates or visiting players, such as Bud Powell, Ben Webster, Freddie Hubbard, Bobby Hutcherson, Kenny Drew, Horace Parlan and Billy Higgins. Blue Note's Francis Wolff supervised Gordon's later sessions for the label on his visits to Europe. The pairing of Gordon with Drew turned out to be one of the classic matchups between a horn player and a pianist, much like Miles Davis with Red Garland or John Coltrane with McCoy Tyner.

From this period come Our Man in Paris, One Flight Up, Gettin' Around, and Clubhouse. Our Man in Paris was a Blue Note session recorded in Paris in 1963 with backup consisting of pianist Powell, drummer Kenny Clarke, and French bassist Pierre Michelot. One Flight Up, recorded in Paris in 1964 with trumpeter Donald Byrd, pianist Kenny Drew, drummer Art Taylor, and Danish bassist Niels-Henning Ørsted Pedersen, features an extended solo by Gordon on the track "Tanya".

Gordon also visited the US occasionally for further recording dates. Gettin' Around was recorded for Blue Note during a visit in May 1965, as was the album Clubhouse which remained unreleased until 1979.

Gordon found Europe in the 1960s a much easier place to live, saying that he experienced less racism and greater respect for jazz musicians.  He also stated that on his visits to the US in the late 1960s and early 1970s, he found the political and social strife disturbing.  While in Copenhagen, Gordon and Drew's trio appeared onscreen in Ole Ege's theatrically released hardcore pornographic film Pornografi – en musical (1971), for which they composed and performed the score.

He switched from Blue Note to Prestige Records (1965–73). For the label, he recorded bop albums like  The Tower of Power! and More Power! (1969) with James Moody, Barry Harris, Buster Williams, and Albert "Tootie" Heath; The Panther! (1970) with Tommy Flanagan, Larry Ridley, and Alan Dawson;  The Jumpin' Blues (1970) with Wynton Kelly, Sam Jones, and Roy Brooks; The Chase! (1970) with Gene Ammons, Jodie Christian, John Young, Cleveland Eaton, Rufus Reid, Wilbur Campbell, Steve McCall, and Vi Redd; and Tangerine (1972) with Thad Jones, Freddie Hubbard, and Hank Jones. Some of the Prestige albums were recorded during visits back to North America while he was still living in Europe; others were made in Europe, including live sets from the Montreux Jazz Festival.

In addition to the recordings Gordon did under his American label contracts, live recordings by European labels and live video from his European period have been released. In 1975 Dexter Gordon signed an exclusive recording contract with Danish label SteepleChase and recorded some of his most inspired sessions like The Apartment (1974), More Than You Know (1975), Stable mates, Swiss Nights vol. 1, 2 and 3, Something Different, Lullaby For A Monster, and not least Biting The Apple, recorded during his homecoming trip to New York, featuring Barry Harris, Sam Jones and Al Foster. The album received the Grand Prix De Jazz in Montreux Switzerland 1977. SteepleChase released live dates from his mid-1960s tenure at the Jazzhus Montmartre in Copenhagen. The video was released under the  Jazz Icons series. The albums he recorded during the 1970s for SteepleChase include

Homecoming

Gordon finally returned to the United States for good in 1976. He recorded "Biting The Apple" for SteepleChase during his homecoming, an album featuring pianist Barry Harris, bassist Sam Jones, and drummer Al Foster. In 1977 the album received the Grand Prix de Disques at the Montreux Jazz Festival in Switzerland. He appeared with Woody Shaw, Ronnie Mathews, Stafford James, and Louis Hayes, for a gig at the Village Vanguard in New York that was dubbed his "homecoming." It was recorded and released by Columbia Records under that title. He observed: "There was so much love and elation; sometimes it was a little eerie at the Vanguard. After the last set they'd turn on the lights and nobody would move."  In addition to the Homecoming album, a series of live albums was released by Blue Note from his stands at Keystone Korner in San Francisco during 1978 and 1979. They featured Gordon, George Cables, Rufus Reid, and Eddie Gladden. He recorded the studio albums Sophisticated Giant with an eleven piece big band in 1977 and Manhattan Symphonie with the Live at Keystone Corner crew in 1978.  The sensation of Gordon's return, and the continued efforts of Art Blakey through 1970s and early 1980s, have been credited with reviving interest in swinging, melodic, acoustically-based classic jazz sounds after the Fusion jazz era that saw an emphasis on electronic sounds and contemporary pop influences.

Musician Emeritus

In 1978 and 1980, Gordon was the DownBeat Musician of the Year and in 1980 he was inducted into the Jazz Hall of Fame.  The US Government honored him with a Congressional Commendation, a Dexter Gordon Day in Washington DC, and a National Endowment for the Arts award for Lifetime Achievement.  In 1986, he was named a member and officer of the French Order of Arts and Letters by the Ministry of Culture in France.

During the 1980s, Gordon, a life-long smoker, was weakened by emphysema.  He remained a popular attraction at concerts and festivals, although his live appearances and recording dates would soon become infrequent.

Gordon's most memorable works from the decade were not in music but in film. He starred in the 1986 movie Round Midnight as "Dale Turner", an expatriate jazz musician in Paris during the late 1950s based loosely on Lester Young and Bud Powell.  That portrayal earned him a nomination for an Academy Award for Best Actor.  In addition, he had a non-speaking role as a piano-playing hospital inmate in the 1990 film Awakenings, which was posthumously released. Before that last film was released he made a guest appearance on the Michael Mann series Crime Story.

Soundtrack performances from Round Midnight were released as the albums Round Midnight and The Other Side of Round Midnight, featuring original music by Herbie Hancock as well as playing by Gordon.  The latter was the last recording released under Gordon's name.  He was a sideman on Tony Bennett's 1987 album, Berlin.

Death
Gordon died of kidney failure and smoking related cancer of the larynx in Philadelphia, on April 25, 1990, at the age of 67.

Family
Gordon's maternal grandfather was Captain Edward L. Baker, who received the Medal of Honor during the Spanish–American War, while serving with the 10th Cavalry Regiment (also known as the Buffalo Soldiers).

Gordon's father, Dr. Frank Gordon, M.D., was one of the first prominent African-American physicians and a graduate of Howard University.

Dexter Gordon had a total of six children, from the oldest to the youngest: Robin Gordon (Los Angeles), California, Deidre (Dee Dee) Gordon (Los Angeles), Mikael Gordon-Solfors (Stockholm), Morten Gordon (Copenhagen) and Benjamin Dexter Gordon (Copenhagen), and seven grandchildren, Raina Moore Trider (Brooklyn), Jared Johnson (Los Angeles), and Matthew Johnson (Los Angeles), Maya Canales (San Francisco) and Jared Canales (San Francisco), Dexter Gordon Bogs (Copenhagen), Dexter Minou Flipper Gordon-Marberger (Stockholm).

When he lived in Denmark, Gordon became friends with the family of the future Metallica drummer Lars Ulrich, and subsequently became Lars's godfather.

Gordon is also survived by his widow Fenja Gordon and her son Benjamin Gordon.

Instruments and mouthpieces
The earliest photographs of Gordon as a player show him with a Conn 30M "Connqueror" and an Otto Link mouthpiece.  In a 1962 interview with the British journalist Les Tomkins, he did not refer to the specific model of mouthpiece but stated that it was made for him personally. He stated that it was stolen around 1952. In the Tomkins interview he referred to his mouthpiece as a small-chambered piece with a 5* (.085" under the Otto Link system) tip opening.  He bought a Selmer Mark VI from Ben Webster after he lost his 10M during the trip to Paris.  In a DownBeat magazine interview from 1977, he referred to his current mouthpiece as an Otto Link model with a #8 (.110" under the Otto Link system) tip opening.

Discography

As a leader 
Dexter Rides Again (1947 78 album; Savoy MG 12130, 1992; SV-120, 2010)
The Hunt with Wardell Gray (1947 78 album; Savoy SJL 2222, 1977)
Dexter Gordon – The Chase with Wardell Gray (Dial Records, 1947, re-released as Spotlite (E) SPJ 130)
Dexter Gordon – Move! (Dial Records, 1947, re-released as Spotlite (E) SPJ 133)
The Duel with Teddy Edwards (Dial, Spotlite, 1947)
Dexter Gordon On Dial, The Complete Sessions – The Chase (compilation, Spotlite (E) SPJ 130 CD)
Dexter Gordon – Long Tall Dexter (Savoy SJL 2211, 1976, compilation of 1940s Savoy tracks, previously released and unreleased)
Dexter Gordon: Settin' the Pace (Savoy SVY 17027, compilation of 1940s Savoy studio tracks, including alternate takes)
Dexter's Mood (Cool & Blue [Switzerland] C&B CD-114, 1994, compilation of Dial and Savoy studio tracks)
The Wardell Gray Memorial, Volume 2 (live jam, Move) (Prestige, PRLP 7009, 1983; CD, OJC 051, 1992)
The Chase and The Steeplechase, with Wardell Gray, Paul Quinichette (1952, Decca; Universal Distribution CD 9061, 2003)
Daddy Plays the Horn (Bethlehem 1955)
Dexter Blows Hot and Cool (Dootone 1955)
The Resurgence of Dexter Gordon (Jazzland, 1960)
Doin' Allright (Blue Note, 1961)
Dexter Calling... (Blue Note, 1961)
Landslide (Blue Note, 1961–62 [1980])
Go! (Blue Note 1962)
A Swingin' Affair (Blue Note, 1962)
Our Man in Paris (Blue Note, 1963, with Bud Powell, Pierre Michelot, Kenny Clarke)
One Flight Up (Blue Note, 1964)
Cheese Cake (SteepleChase, 1979 [1964])
King Neptune (SteepleChase, 1979 [1964])
I Want More (SteepleChase, 1980 [1964])
Love for Sale (SteepleChase, 1982 [1964])
It's You or No One (SteepleChase, 1983 [1964])
Billie's Bounce (SteepleChase, 1983 [1964])
Gettin' Around (Blue Note 1965)
Clubhouse (Blue Note, 1979 [1965])
Wee Dot (SteepleChase, 2003 [1965])
Loose Walk (SteepleChase, 2004 [1965])
Misty (SteepleChase, 2004 [1965])
Heartaches (SteepleChase, 2004 [1965])
Ladybird (SteepleChase, 2005 [1965])
Stella by Starlight (SteepleChase, 2005 [1966])
The Squirrel (Blue Note, 2001 [1967])
Satin Doll (SteepleChase, 2012 [1967])
Both Sides of Midnight (Black Lion, 1988 [1967])
Body and Soul (Black Lion, 1988 [1967])
Take The "A" Train (Black Lion, 1989 [1967])
After Hours (SteepleChase, 1986, [1969])
After Midnight (SteepleChase, 1986, [1969])
Live at the Amsterdam Paradiso (Catfish, 1971 [1969])
A Day in Copenhagen (MPS, 1969) – with Slide Hampton
The Tower of Power! (Prestige, 1969) – with James Moody
More Power! (Prestige, 1969)
L.T.D. Live At The Left Bank (Prestige, 2001 [1969])
XXL Live At The Left Bank (Prestige, 2002 [1969])
Some Other Spring (Sonet, 1970) – with Karin Krog
Dexter Gordon with Junior Mance at Montreux (Prestige, 1970, with Junior Mance)
The Panther! (Prestige, 1970, with Tommy Flanagan and Alan Dawson. Prestige Records)
Live At The Both/And Club, San Francisco (BPM BPE-6101, 1970, with George Duke and Donald Garrett and Oliver Johnson)
The Chase! (Prestige, 1970, with Gene Ammons)
The Jumpin' Blues (Prestige, 1970, with Wynton Kelly)
Those Were The Days (Moon, 1995 [1967–71])
The Shadow Of Your Smile (Steeplechase SCCD-31206 1971)
Tangerine (Prestige, 1975 [1972])
Ca'Purange (Prestige, 1972, with Thad Jones, Hank Jones, Stanley Clarke and Louis Hayes)
Generation (Prestige, 1972, with Freddie Hubbard, Cedar Walton and others)
Afterhours/The Great Pescara Jam Sessions Vol 1&2 (Ports Song, 1973, with Eric Ineke)
Blues à la Suisse (Prestige, 1973)
The Montmartre Collection Vol.II - Blues Walk  (Black Lion Records, 1974)
Candlelight Lady (SteepleChase, 2014 [1974])
The Apartment (SteepleChase, 1974)
The Rainbow People (Steeplechase, 2002 [1974], with Benny Bailey)
Round Midnight (SteepleChase, 1991 [1974], with Benny Bailey)
Revelation (SteepleChase, 1995 [1974], with Benny Bailey)
More Than You Know (SteepleChase, 1975) with Orchestra arranged and conducted by Palle Mikkelborg
Stable Mable (SteepleChase, 1975)
Something Different (SteepleChase, 1975)
Bouncin' with Dex (SteepleChase, 1975)
Swiss Nights Vol. 1 (SteepleChase, 1976 [1975])
Swiss Nights Vol. 2 (SteepleChase, 1978 [1975])
Swiss Nights Vol. 3 (SteepleChase, 1979 [1975])
Live In Chateauvallon (Elemental, 11/8/78 [2020)
Lullaby for a Monster (SteepleChase, 1981 [1976])
True Blue (Xanadu, 1976, with Al Cohn)
Silver Blue (Xanadu, 1976, with Al Cohn)
Biting the Apple (SteepleChase, 1976)
Homecoming: Live at the Village Vanguard (Columbia, 1976, with Woody Shaw, Ronnie Mathews, Stafford James, Louis Hayes)
Jazz Classics (Aurophon, 1977, with Lionel Hampton, Bucky Pizzarelli, Hank Jones, George Duvivier, Candido Camero, Oliver Jackson)
Sophisticated Giant (Columbia, 1977, with 11-piece big-band including Woody Shaw, Slide Hampton, Bobby Hutcherson, and Benny Bailey)
Manhattan Symphonie (Columbia, 1978, with Rufus Reid – bass, Eddie Gladden – percussion, and George Cables – keyboard)
Live at Carnegie Hall (Columbia, 1998 [1978], 2 tracks with Johnny Griffin)
North Sea Jazz Legendary Concerts (North Sea Jazz, 1979)
Nights at the Keystone, Volumes 1-3 (1979, Blue Note;  CD release 1990)
The Montmartre Collection Vol.I  (Black Lion Records, 1981)
Gotham City (Columbia, 1981, with Woody Shaw, Cedar Walton, George Benson, Percy Heath, Art Blakey)
American Classic (Elektra/Musician, 1982, featuring Grover Washington Jr. and Shirley Scott)
The Other Side of Round Midnight (Blue Note, 1986)

As a sideman
With Rob Agerbeek
 All Souls (Dexterity, 1972, with Eric Ineke and others)
With Gene Ammons
The Chase! (Prestige, 1970)
Gene Ammons and Friends at Montreux (Prestige, 1973)
With Louis Armstrong
Dexter Gordon, Vol. 1 Young Dex 1941-1944 (Masters Of Jazz MJCD 112)
 Louis Armstrong And His Orchestra 1944-1945  (Blue Ace BA 3603)
 Louis Armstrong And His Orchestra  (AFRS One Night Stand 240) (V-Disc, 1944)
 Louis Armstrong And His Orchestra  (AFRS One Night Stand 253) (V-Disc, 1944)
 Louis Armstrong And His Orchestra  (AFRS One Night Stand 267) (V-Disc, 1944)
 Louis Armstrong New Orleans Masters, Vol. 2  (Swing House (E) SWH 44)
 Louis Armstrong And His Orchestra  (AFRS Spotlight Bands 382) (V-Disc, 1944)
 Louis Armstrong – Chronological Study  (MCA Decca 3063 72)
 Louis Armstrong And His Orchestra  (AFRS Spotlight Bands 444) (V-Disc, 1944)
 Louis Armstrong And His Orchestra  (AFRS Spotlight Bands 465) (V-Disc, 1944)
 Various Artists, Louis, Pops And Tram  (IAJRC 21) (off V-Disc, 1944)
 Louis Armstrong Armed Forces Radio Service 1943/44  (Duke (It) D 1021)
With Tony Bennett
Berlin (Columbia, 1987)
With Ralph Burns
 Various Artists – OKeh Jazz  (Epic EG 37315)
With Benny Carter
 The Fabulous Benny Carter (1946, Audio Lab AL 1505)
 Benny Carter And His Orchestra (AFRS Jubilee 246) (V-Disc, 1947)
 Various Artists – Jazz Off The Air, Vol. 3  (Spotlite (E) SPJ 147) (off V-Disc 1947)
With Nat King Cole
 Nat King Cole Meets The Master Saxes 1943 (Phoenix Jazz LP 5)
With Tadd Dameron
 Tadd Dameron/Babs Gonzales/Dizzy Gillespie – Capitol Jazz Classics, Vol. 13: Strictly Bebop  (Capitol M 11059)
With Billy Eckstine
 The Chronological Billy Eckstine and His Orchestra, 1944-1945 (CD, Classic Records [France], 1997)
 Billy Eckstine, The Legendary Big Band (SVY 17125)
With Booker Ervin
 Setting the Pace (Prestige, 1965)
With Lowell Fulson
 Lowell Fulson  (Swing Time 320)
With Dizzy Gillespie
 Dexter Gordon, Vol. 2 Young Dex 1944-1946  (Masters Of Jazz MJCD 128)
 Dizzy Gillespie – Groovin' High  (Savoy MG 12020, 1992; SV 152, 2010)
With Lionel Hampton
Dexter Gordon, Vol. 1 Young Dex 1941-1944 (Masters Of Jazz MJCD 112)
 Lionel Hampton, Vol. 1: 1941-1942  (Coral (G) COPS 7185)
 Decca Jazz Heritage Series DL-79244
With Herbie Hancock
 Takin' Off (Blue Note, 1962)
 Round Midnight (1986), Columbia Records
With Wynonie Harris
 Wynonie Harris – Love Is Like Rain / Your Money Don't Mean A Thing (Come Live With Me Baby)  (King 4217)
With Fletcher Henderson
 Fletcher Henderson And His Orchestra (AFRS Jubilee 76), (V-Disc, 1944)
 Fletcher Henderson And His Orchestra (AFRS Jubilee 77), (V-Disc, 1944)
With Helen Humes
 Various Artists – Black California  (Savoy SJL 2215)
 Helen Humes – Be-Baba-Leba 1942-52  (Whiskey, Women And... Gene Norman "Just Jazz" concert, February 2, 1952, KM 701)
 Helen Humes – New Million Dollar Secret  (Whiskey, Women And... Gene Norman "Just Jazz" concert, February 2, 1952, KM 707)
With Philly Joe Jones
Philly Mignon (Galaxy, 1977)
with Stan Levey
 Stan Levey – This Time The Drum's On Me  (Bethlehem BCP 37)
With Jackie McLean
 The Meeting (SteepleChase, 1974) 
The Source (SteepleChase, 1974)
With Gerry Mulligan
 Gerry Mulligan – Capitol Jazz Classics, Vol. 4: Walking Shoes (Capitol M 11029)
 Classic Capitol Jazz Sessions  (Mosaic MQ19-170)
With Charlie Parker
 Charlie Parker – Every Bit Of It 1945  (Spotlite (E) SPJ 150D)
With Leo Parker
 The Be Bop Boys  (Savoy SJL 2225)
 Leo Parker – Birth Of Bop, Vol. 1  (Savoy XP 8060)
With Pony Poindexter
 Pony's Express (Epic, 1962)
 Stella By Starlight (co leader) (SteepleChase 1966)
With Jimmy Rushing
 Jimmy Rushing/Don Redman/Russell Jacquet/Joe Thomas – Big Little Bands  (1946, Onyx ORI 220)
 Black California, Vol. 2: Anthology  (1946, Savoy SJL 2242)
With Les Thompson
 Les Thompson – Gene Norman Presents Just Jazz  (RCA Victor LPM 3102)
With Ben Webster
 Ben Webster Nonet  (1945, Jazz Archives JA 35)

References

Further reading
Gordon, Maxine (2018) Sophisticated Giant: The Life and Legacy of Dexter Gordon (University of California Press)

External links

Sophisticated Giant: The Dexter Gordon Discography

Dexter Gordon Multimedia Directory 
Dexter Gordon: 12 Essential Tracks by Eric Novod (www.jazz.com)

Dexter Gordon Collection at the Library of Congress

1923 births
1990 deaths
20th-century American composers
20th-century American saxophonists
African-American jazz musicians
American jazz composers
American male jazz composers
American jazz tenor saxophonists
American male saxophonists
Bebop saxophonists
Blue Note Records artists
Columbia Records artists
David di Donatello winners
Deaths from kidney failure
Grammy Award winners
Hard bop saxophonists
Jazz musicians from California
Musicians from Los Angeles
Savoy Records artists
SteepleChase Records artists
Swing saxophonists
Xanadu Records artists
American expatriates in Denmark
American expatriates in France
Deaths from cancer in Pennsylvania
Deaths from laryngeal cancer
20th-century American male musicians
Black Lion Records artists
20th-century jazz composers
Sonet Records artists
20th-century African-American musicians